Snakes 'n' Ladders is the seventeenth studio album by the Scottish hard rock band Nazareth, released in 1989 on Vertigo Records. This was the last album with Manny Charlton, who retired from the band in 1990.

Track listing

1997 Castle Communications Bonus Tracks

Three bonus tracks above are from German single Winner on the Night.

2002 30th Anniversary Edition Bonus Tracks

Personnel

Band members
Dan McCafferty - vocals
Manny Charlton - guitars, keyboards & computer programming
Pete Agnew - bass guitar
Darrell Sweet - drums

Other credits
Joey Balin - producer
Engineered and mixed by Martin Heyes
Sleeve design - A.Backhausen, Cologne
Illustration - Marc Klinnert
Manny Elias - drum programming
Phil Spalding - additional bass parts
Dzal Martin - additional guitar parts
Danny Cummings - percussion on "Trouble"
Mark Feltham - harmonica on "Lady Luck"

Chart performance

References

Nazareth (band) albums
1989 albums
Vertigo Records albums